I Need A Job...So I Can Buy More Auto-Tune is a studio album by American musician and producer Swamp Dogg. It was released on February 25, 2022, via Don Giovanni Records. The album was recorded by Swamp Dogg and Moogstar in Los Angeles, and features contributions from Guitar Shorty and Willie Clayton.

Track listing

Personnel
Jerry "Swamp Dogg" Williams Jr. – vocals, producer
Willie Clayton – vocals
Larry "MoogStar" Clemon – producer
Norman Whitfield, Jr. – producer
Guitar Shorty- guitar
Crazy Tomes- guitar
Lao Delozada – mixing
Ben Clark – design
Matt Dilmore – photography
Ian Dillon – lacquer cut

References

External links
 I Need A Job​.​.​.​So I Can Buy More Auto​-​Tune at Bandcamp
 

2022 albums
Swamp Dogg albums
Don Giovanni Records albums